Dyke (UK) or dike (US) may refer to:

General uses
 Dyke (slang), a slang word meaning "lesbian"
 Dike (geology), a subvertical sheet-like intrusion of magma or sediment
 Dike (mythology), Dikē, the Greek goddess of moral justice
 Dikes, diagonal pliers, also called side-cutting pliers, a hand tool used by electricians and others
 Dyke (automobile company), established 1899

Structures
 Dyke (embankment) or dike, a natural or artificial slope or wall to regulate water levels, often called a levee in American English
 Ditch, a water-filled drainage trench
 A regional term for a dry stone wall

People
 Dyke (surname)
 Dyke baronets, a title in the Baronetage of England
 Dykes (surname), a British surname found particularly in northern England

Places

Settlements
 Dike, Iowa, United States
 Dykes, Missouri, United States
 Dyke, Moray, Scotland
 Dike, Texas, United States
 Dyke, Virginia, United States
 Dyke, Lincolnshire, England
 Little Dyke, Nova Scotia, Canada

Earthworks
 Car Dyke, a Roman boundary ditch in Eastern England
 Devil's Dyke (disambiguation), one of several ancient embankments or ditches (or both)
 Foss Dyke, a Roman canal in England linking the River Trent to the River Witham at Lincoln
 Offa's Dyke, historic earthwork dividing Mercia and Wales
 Wansdyke (earthwork), dividing Wessex from the lands south west of it
 Wat's Dyke, An earthwork running through the northern Welsh Marches from Basingwerk Abbey to Maesbury

Geological features
 The Great Dyke, a mineral-rich feature that runs through Zimbabwe 
 Mount Desire Dyke, an igneous intrusion in South Australia

See also
 Dyke & the Blazers, 1960s R&B group
 Van Dyke (disambiguation)
 "D-Yikes!", an episode of South Park
 99 Dike, an asteroid
 Winter Dyke, another name for a clothes horse